Brocks may refer to:

 Brocks Fireworks, English manufacturer of fireworks
 Brocks Gap, water gap in Rockingham County, Virginia
 Brocks Peak, the sharp rocky peak in Ellsworth Mountains, Antarctica

People
 Hendrik Brocks (born 1942), Indonesian cyclist
 Karl Brocks (1912–1972), German meteorologist and Hauptmann during World War II

See also
 Broks, surname
 Brock (disambiguation)
 Townes–Brocks syndrome, rare genetic disease